Phaeotremella foliacea (synonym Tremella foliacea) is a species of fungus in the family Phaeotremellaceae. It produces brownish, frondose, gelatinous basidiocarps (fruit bodies) and is parasitic on the mycelium of Stereum sanguinolentum, a fungus that grows on dead attached and recently fallen branches of conifers. It is widespread in north temperate regions. In the UK it has the recommended English name leafy brain and has also been called jelly leaf and brown witch's butter. Prior to 2017, the name Tremella foliacea was also applied to similar-looking species on broadleaf trees, now distinguished as Phaeotremella frondosa and Phaeotremella fimbriata.

Taxonomy 
Tremella foliacea was first published in 1800 by South African-born mycologist Christiaan Hendrik Persoon. The name remained in use until molecular research, based on cladistic analysis of DNA sequences, showed that Tremella foliacea was not closely related to the type species of Tremella but belonged in a separate genus, Phaeotremella. Further research revealed that the name Tremella foliacea covered several similar but distinct species, the name Phaeotremella foliacea being restricted to the fungus growing on conifers.  

The epithet "foliacea" means "leafy", with reference to the shape of the fruit bodies.

Herman Phaff and L. do Carmo Sousa described the yeast Cryptococcus skinneri in 1962 from the frass of the beetle Scolytus tsugae feeding on Western Hemlock (Tsuga heterophylla). DNA sequencing has shown that this is the yeast state of Phaeotremella foliacea.

Description 
Fruit bodies are gelatinous, brown to dark brown, up to 5 cm (2 in) across, and seaweed-like (with branched, undulating fronds). Microscopically, the hyphae are clamped and occur in a dense gelatinous matrix. Haustorial cells arise on the hyphae, producing filaments that attach to and penetrate the hyphae of the host. The basidia are tremelloid (globose to ellipsoid, with oblique to vertical septa), 12 to 18 by 10 to 14 μm, usually unstalked. The basidiospores are mostly ellipsoid, smooth, 5.5 to 9.5 by 4.5 to 8.5 μm, and germinate by hyphal tube or by yeast cells.

Similar species 
Phaeotremella frondosa is a common and widespread species parasitizing Stereum species on broadleaf trees. It often produces larger and paler fruit bodies than Phaeotremella foliacea. Phaeotremella fimbriata is a European species parasitizing Stereum rugosum on broadleaf trees. Its fruitbodies are comparatively small and dark brown to black. Phaeotremella eugeniae is its temperate Asian counterpart.

Habitat and distribution 
Phaeotremella foliacea is a parasite of Stereum sanguinolentum, growing on the host's hyphae in the wood rather than on the host's fruit bodies. Following its hosts, fruit bodies of P. foliacea are typically found on dead, attached or recently fallen branches of conifers.

The species is known from North America, Europe, and northern Asia.

References

External links 

 

Tremellomycetes
Fungi described in 1800
Fungi of Asia
Fungi of Europe
Fungi of North America
Taxa named by Christiaan Hendrik Persoon